Merkezefendi Belediyesi Denizli Basket, due to current sponsorship Yukatel Merkezefendi, is a Turkish professional basketball club based in Denizli. The team is currently playing in the Basketball Super League. Their home arena is the Pamukkale University Arena which has a capacity of 5,000 seats. The team whose name was Yüksekçıta Koleji, was renamed Merkezefendi Belediyesi Denizli Basket in 2018.

History
The team whose name was Yüksekçıta Koleji, was renamed Merkezefendi Belediyesi Denizli Basket in 2018. End of the regular season of 2018–19, the team that was competing in the Turkish Basketball Second League completed the season undefeated in 20 games. The team defeated Beylikdüzü Basket, 2–0 in play-offs, defeated Boluspor, 3–0 in quarter-finals, defeated Erzurum BŞB Gençlik, 3–1 in semi-finals and promoted to the Turkish Basketball First League. Also the team got their first defeat of the season in the semi-finals. At the final game on 13 May 2019 that was played on Sinan Erdem Dome, Merkezefendi Belediyesi Denizli Basket defeated Lokman Hekim Fethiye Belediyespor, 77–70, and the team became the champion of 2018–19 Turkish Basketball Second League.

They finished the 2020–21 season as regular season leaders and earned the right to compete in the top tier (BSL) for the 2021–22 season onward.

Players

Current roster

Depth chart

Honours

Domestic competitions
Turkish Basketball First League
 Winner (1): 2020–21
Turkish Basketball Second League
 Winner (1): 2018–19

Notable players

 Emircan Koşut
 Jerome Jordan
 Rihards Lomažs
 Kalin Lucas
 Andrew Harrison
 Xavier Rathan-Mayes

References

External links 
 Official Page in Turkish Basketball Federation website 
 Eurobasket.com Page
 Twitter Page
 Facebook Page

Basketball teams in Turkey
Sport in Denizli
2018 establishments in Turkey
Basketball teams established in 2018